Walthamstow Stadium was a greyhound racing track in the London Borough of Waltham Forest in east London. It was regarded as the leading greyhound racing stadium in Britain following the closure of White City in 1984. The stadium closed on 16 August 2008.

Greyhound racing

Crooked Billet
In the early part of the 20th century the Myrtle Grove sports ground was built and used by the Walthamstow Grange Football Club from 1908. By 1929 the ground hosted greyhound racing for the first time and was known as the Crooked Billet Greyhound and whippet track (named after the nearby Crooked Billet public house). The track was an independent track, unaffiliated to a governing body.
In 1931, William Chandler, a bookmaker by trade, decided to build on the existing independent track. Chandler also had shares in the Hackney Wick Stadium.

Opening
It cost Chandler £24,000 to buy the site and the Art Deco parapet entrance was built in 1932 with the clock tower and totalisator board being designed by Thomas & Edge Ltd. builders of Woolwich. The grand official opening was on Monday 19 June 1933, opened by Jack Kid Berg and in which aviator Amy Johnson presented a trophy as a guest.

Pre-war history
From 1931 to 1943 the stadium underwent three major rebuilds as Chandler strived for the perfect stadium. The kennels and paddock were situated between the third and fourth bends with a veterinary room and trainers room at either end. Between the first and second bends was the Senior Club sandwiched by two stands. The back straight had one large covered stand but the home straight had another Senior Club which was located under the upstairs ballroom and dance band. There were two tea rooms and a wet and dry bar in the main grandstand and sixteen tote buildings. The track was 440 yards in circumference and was described as the slowest and most difficult course in London. The hare was an 'Inside Sumner' and there was an artesian well near the fourth bend used for watering the track.

On 13 January 1938 the track raced under National Greyhound Racing Club rules for the first time. In 1941 the stadium introduced its first major competition, called 'The Test'. The trainers and greyhounds attached to Walthamstow were situated in kennels to the north called 'The
Limes' in Sewardstone Road not far from Epping Forest. Walthamstow were unusual in the fact that they hired several female trainers at the time; a practice attributed to the influence of Frances Chandler (the wife of William's son Charles). Frances was a leading greyhound owner in the industry. Female trainers employed during the period mentioned included Mrs F Deathbridge, Meg Fairbrass, Miss J Griffiths and Mrs B Lark. Wartime champion greyhound Ballynennan Moon won the Stewards Cup and broke the track record in 1942.

Late 1940s
As the war ended the stadium hosted Winston Churchill as he addressed 20,000 people when canvassing support for re-election. A major event called the Grand Prix was inaugurated in 1945 and later became a classic race. Towards the end of 1946 William 'Billy' Chandler died leaving equal shares of the business to his children. Charles became the new Managing Director, Victor snr (whose son is Victor Chandler) and Jack were concentrating on their bookmaking businesses and Ronnie was training greyhounds in Ireland.
The industry and Walthamstow experienced an extraordinary boom in business with tote turnover in excess of £7 million in 1946.

In 1948 the track had their first English Greyhound Derby finalist in Doughery Boy and two more female trainers Noreen Collin and Miss K Sanderson joined in 1950. Joe Coral (founder of Coral Empire) stood as a track bookmaker before branching into betting offices in the sixties. In 1952 the neon lighting greyhound sign was added to commemorate the 1952 Coronation, the same year the land which housed the Salisbury Hall Manor House (once owned by Henry VIII) was purchased by Chandler, demolished and used as the car park for the stadium.

1950s and 1960s
Tom 'Paddy' Reilly, Dave Geggus and Barney O’Connor became three very prominent trainers at the track and in the industry; Reilly replaced Noreen Collin in 1953. Other trainers at the time were Jack Durkin, Kevin O'Neil and Reg 'String' Marsh. In 1963 the track introduced a closed circuit television system  and in 1965 chromotography (a drug testing unit) was first used at Walthamstow in their purpose built lab. In 1968 the bends were sanded and banked producing a much faster surface than all-grass.

1970s

In 1971 a new stand with a restaurant and an escalator were added. Charles Chandler (1976) and his brother Victor Chandler (1977) both died, bringing uncertainty as to the future of the company. Charles Chandler Jr. was made the new chairman and Percy Chandler the new managing director. Victor Chandler Jr. inherited a 20% stake but sold his share concentrating on the bookmaking business. The Greyhound Racing Association held a third share in the track but had to sell to alleviate their debts. Suddenly it became apparent that an interested party could acquire a 52% stake and have the controlling interest. Coral and Ladbrokes expressed an interest but Charles Jr., Percy and Frances Chandler spent over £400,000 to withstand the takeover attempts and buy the track outright.

1980s

Racing Manager (RM) Ray Spalding left to be replaced by Tony Smith in 1983 with Chris Page as assistant RM. Charley Chan's nightclub was built under the clock tower totalisator board in 1984 and a new generation of trainer included Jim Sherry, Dick Hawkes and Kenny Linzell. In 1986 one of the leading trainers in the country had just joined Oxford Stadium but switched to Walthamstow after receiving a late job offer. Less than a year later Baggs trained Signal Spark to the 1987 English Greyhound Derby crown, remarkably the first time the track had achieved the accolade.

A fourth major event was introduced in 1987, called the Arc. After Barney O'Connor died in 1988 further trainer appointments included Ernie Gaskin Sr. in 1988 and John Coleman in 1989. Walthamstow became the leading track in Britain and in 1988 tote turnover figures were £16,355,089.

1990s
Chris Page became Racing Manager and a second Derby triumph arrived when Slippy Blue won the 1990 event. Page recruited Linda Mullins who went on to win five Greyhound Trainer of the Year awards. The track earned their first Bookmakers Afternoon Greyhound Service contract and John Coleman won the trainers championship. Another leading trainer called Paul Young arrived during 1996. In 1998 the Racing Post sponsored the Racing Post Festival at the track. Trainer Linda Jones was appointed in 1999, and would be Greyhound Trainer of the Year twice.

Final years

Linda Mullins retired with the trainers going to her son John, Ernie Gaskin Sr. retired in 2005 with the kennels being taken over by his son Ernest Gaskin Jr. and Mark Wallis took over from Linda Jones. Despite the success the directors agreed to the sale of the company's freehold property to a development consortium led by Yoo Capital and K W Linfoot plc. Formal contracts were exchanged. The final race was held on Saturday 16 August at 11pm, the winner being trap two 'Mountjoy Diamond'.

Speedway
Motor cycle speedway racing was staged at the Walthamstow Greyhound Stadium in Chingford Road in 1934 and between 1949 and 1951. Between 1949 and 1951 the team, known as the Walthamstow Wolves, raced in the National League Second Division with moderate success. The team included ex-England international George Newton. At that time all the other London clubs, Wembley, Wimbledon, West Ham, Harringay and New Cross raced in the First Division. The sport left the stadium in the 1950s owing to declining attendance and complaints of noise from local residents. The track was covered in tarmac for easier maintenance of the dog track.

Stock car racing
Stock car racing took place at many greyhound and speedway tracks. Between 1962 and 1968 Walthamstow Stadium was home to BriSCA "Senior" F1 and "Junior" F2 stock cars.

On 29 March 1968 the Spedeworth promotion took over the running of racing at Walthamstow with their Superstox, Stock Car, Hot Rod, Banger and Midget Racing. The promotion continued there until the end of the 1974 racing season.

Decline and closure

In 1984 a nightclub called Charlie Chan's was opened within the foundations of the clocktower. It closed permanently in November 2007. It could be said that if a person from the East End of London refers to "going down the dogs", they were probably going to the dog track at Walthamstow or Romford Greyhound Stadium. There were once 33 greyhound tracks in London, but only Romford and Crayford remain, after Catford closed in 2003 and Wimbledon in 2017.

The directors of Walthamstow Stadium Limited have agreed to the sale of the company's freehold property at Walthamstow Stadium to a development consortium led by London and Quadrant. They claim falling profits and attendances forced the sale. Formal contracts have been exchanged and completion is expected on or before 1 September 2008. The final race was held during Meeting 152 on Saturday 16 August 2008 at 23:00, the winner being No. 2 'Mountjoy Diamond'. Numerous attempts to buy or lease the stadium back from developers have been made but have so far been unsuccessful. On 8 May 2012 the application for housing on the site was approved by four votes to three. On 30 October 2012 Mayor of London Boris Johnson approved the plans for housing. The stadium buildings were demolished and were replaced with 292 new homes, but the Grade II-listed front facade remains.

In February 2016 the 1930s neon lights were turned on for the first time since the stadium's closure in 2008, following a £100,000 restoration.

Competitions

The Grand Prix

The Arc

The Test

Steward's Cup

The Circuit

1944-1974 (525 yards), 1951-1955 (not held), 1975-2007 (475m)

Track records

Pre Metric records

Post Metric records

Notes

References

External links
 BBC News pictures of Walthamstow Stadium
 Satellite view of Walthamstow Stadium
 Facebook Save our Stow

Sport in the London Borough of Waltham Forest
Defunct greyhound racing venues in the United Kingdom
Sports venues in London
Defunct speedway venues in England
Art Deco architecture in London
Sports venues completed in 1933
Defunct sports venues in London
Defunct greyhound racing venues in London
Greyhound racing in London
Demolished sports venues in the United Kingdom